Lennox Capello Ogutu is a Kenyan defender who features for Kenyan Premier League side Nairobi City Stars. He formerly turned out for Mathare United.

Career
Ogutu arrived at Mathare United straight out of high school in 2016. That year, Lennox was part of the clubs' junior side that won two straight KPL U20 Championships after wins in August
and December tournaments. 

He graduated to the senior team in 2017 and went on to feature in 32 of 34 in his maiden Kenyan Premier League season. He stayed on at the club for the 2017, 2018, 2018/19, 2019/20 and 2020/21 seasons before crossing over to Nairobi City Stars. His debut goal for City Stars was against his former side Mathare United. 

While at Mathare, Ogutu was called up to the Kenya National U23 team for ties against Mauritius in the first round  2019 Africa U-23 Cup of Nations qualification. He was an unused substitute in home and away games played.

Honours

Club
Mathare United
 KPL U20 Championship: (Aug 2016)  
 KPL U20 Championship: (Dec 2016)

References

External links
 

1997 births
Living people
Kenyan footballers
Nairobi City Stars players
Mathare United F.C. players
Kenyan Premier League players